LORAN-C transmitter Hexian is the master station of the China South Sea  LORAN-C Chain ( GRI 6780 ).
It uses a transmission power of 1200 kW.

References
http://www.megapulse.com/chaininfo.html 

Towers in China
LORAN-C transmitters in China